Rubén Pagliari (20 September 1927 – 28 November 1987) was an Argentine basketball player who competed in the 1952 Summer Olympics.

References

1927 births
1987 deaths
Argentine men's basketball players
Olympic basketball players of Argentina
Basketball players at the 1955 Pan American Games
Basketball players at the 1952 Summer Olympics
Pan American Games medalists in basketball
Pan American Games silver medalists for Argentina
Medalists at the 1955 Pan American Games